Christopher "Chris" Broad (born 21 April 1990), also known online as Abroad in Japan, is an English YouTuber, filmmaker, podcast host, and former Assistant Language Teacher. He focuses on the creation of videos about Japanese culture, Japanese food and travel in Japan, primarily in the Tōhoku region.

Personal life
Broad's interest in filmmaking began at the age of eight when his grandfather had him record his aunt's wedding in Vancouver since his grandfather could not travel from England to attend the wedding. Broad briefly appeared on the TV series Robot Wars in the UK, where his father and team were regular contestants, with their robot Killertron.

Broad studied English and business at the University of Kent from 2009 to 2012. While attending the university, he developed interests in film making and Japanese culture. After graduating, Broad worked a number of jobs, including a porter role at Leeds Castle and an office job at an energy company. After learning of and applying to the JET Programme,  Broad moved to the city of Sakata in Yamagata Prefecture in 2012 while creating videos about his life and experiences in Japan. He has since left the programme and moved to Sendai.

In 2023, Broad revealed on Twitter that he was engaged to fellow YouTuber Sharla Hinskens.

YouTube channel
Upon moving to Sakata, Yamagata to teach as an Assistant Language Teacher with the JET Programme in 2012, Broad decided to vlog about some of his experiences as a foreigner living in the rural Tōhoku region. One of Broad's first videos to gain widespread attention was his review of the Japan-only McDonald's McChoco Potatoes. Other subjects of his early videos included topics like what it's like to drive in Japan, KFC as a mainstay of every Japanese Christmas, and love hotels. He later moved to Sendai to remain in the region, but to be somewhere better connected to the rest of the country to expand his business opportunities as a full time youtuber. As the channel grew in notability, Broad began to make more travel-themed videos, such as a video describing a trip to Aomori where he visited the city's Nebuta museum and another where he visited Hokkaido with his close friend Natsuki Aso, who often appears in Chris' videos.

On 29 August 2017, Broad was visiting a town in Aomori Prefecture near Shirakami-Sanchi wilderness area when he was woken up by the J-Alert being triggered by the North Korean August 2017 missile launch over Japan. He posted a video about how rude it was that they would carry out their test so early in the morning and proceeded to criticize the regime of Kim Jong-un, as well as foreigners who visit North Korea. The video was featured as "Trending" the day it was posted. It then went on to attract national attention in Japan, with Broad being selected to represent the word "J-Alert" in Japan's annual Words of the Year event.

On 31 May 2018, Broad released the documentary film Natsuki: The Movie telling the story of Broad and his friend Natsuki's journey to Europe.

In 2018, Broad started his Journey Across Japan series featuring various YouTubers, such as The Anime Man, and his friends as he travels across Japan by bike, documenting local customs and daily life along the way. A sequel to the series was made in 2020, featuring The Anime Man and Natsuki in a road trip adventure originating in Tokyo, but taking place primarily around the Chūbu region called Journey Across Japan: Escape to Fuji. In early 2021, Broad began filming a third entry in the series, titled Journey Across Japan: The Lost Islands with The Anime Man and Natsuki, which takes place in the region of Kyushu. In June 2021, the single "Too Much Volcano!" by Abroad in Japan and featuring The Anime Man and Natsuki Aso was released on the iTunes Store and Spotify; the song and the accompanying music video was recorded during the production of The Lost Islands and is about Mount Aso. The song peaked at number 14 on the UK iTunes downloads charts on 22 June 2021.

In December 2021, Broad unveiled a new studio that was built by set design company Jiyuro. It is inspired by the 1982 film Blade Runner and 1960s Japanese shopping arcades. On 16 March 2022, the studio was damaged by the 2022 Fukushima earthquake.

Documentary work
The channel also has featured some documentary-style videos. In addition to the Natsuki movie mentioned above, one focused on the effects of the 2011 Tōhoku earthquake and tsunami on the citizens of Kesennuma and how they and external powers are working to rebuild their city's image and livelihood. Broad noted that the aversion to the area because of the Fukushima Daiichi nuclear disaster bothered him and that caused him to work on documentaries about the area, including one that is in development that will focus on the positive aspects of life in Fukushima. In December 2019, he released a documentary interview of the rock artist Hyde, during the artist's performances at Zepp Tokyo. Broad revisited the disaster area in a second documentary uploaded in 2020 about the region's recovery. YouTube CEO Susan Wojcicki praised Broad's documentary work in reference to this second documentary about the 2011 disaster in a tweet she posted on 1 December 2020. A publication by the Cabinet of Japan praised Broad's work on the documentaries for his ability to capture "the heartbreaking sorrow of the disaster victims and the hopeful steps being taken towards recovery".

Podcast

Together with Pete Donaldson, Broad presents a twice weekly Abroad in Japan series of podcasts on Radio Stakhanov about Japanese culture, current events, and cuisine. Some recurring topics of the series are the Lotte soft serve, Coolish and a pizza vending machine that was once functioning in Hiroshima. The pair also talk about Japan-related stories and questions submitted by their audience by email in a segment they call the "Fax Machine" as a jest towards the obsolete method of communication that is still commonly used in many Japanese workplaces.

Other work
Broad spoke at a TEDx conference at Tohoku University where he presented about the power of YouTube and encouraged the audience to share their experiences with the world through the platform.
In 2017, Broad was the host of a documentary about cats in Japanese culture called Cat Nation where he (despite being allergic to cats) travelled throughout Japan to document the cat-centered activities or places, such as visiting the Wakayama Electric Railway where a cat named Tama became a tourist attraction after it became the station master of Kishi Station. Broad hosted an episode of "Explore Regional Flavors – Visiting the Hidden Village", a documentary about Japan's local cuisine broadcast on NHK World in August 2017.
In 2022, Broad appeared in an interview with the Foreign Correspondents' Club of Japan, and received an honorary membership for a duration of one year.  On 11 December 2022, Broad participated in a chessboxing match with PJ Brittain at the Mogul Chessboxing Championship, held at the Galen Center in Los Angeles, United States.

Discography

Singles

Collaborators
  – presenter, amateur musician and owner of a beauty salon in Yamagata, Japan
  – Co-presenter and Director of LifeBridge Inc
 Sharla (formerly Sharla in Japan and now known as Sharmeleon) – Guest (various appearances)
 Pete Donaldson – Podcast co-host, former London radio DJ and Japanophile
 The Anime Man – Guest (various appearances), co-host (Journey Across Japan)
 CDawgVA – Co-host (Chris & Connor's Wacky Weekend series)
Trash Taste – Guest (various appearances)
Premier Two – Guest, Twitch Streamer

References

External links

Year of birth missing (living people)
Date of birth missing (living people)
Living people
YouTube channels
British video bloggers
British radio personalities
British roboticists
British expatriates in Japan
YouTube channels launched in 2012
2018 podcast debuts
Audio podcasts